Montserrado-2 is an electoral district for the elections to the House of Representatives of Liberia. The district covers Johnsonville Township and the Double Bridge, Jacob Town and Zinc Factory communities of Paynesville.

Elected representatives

References

Electoral districts in Liberia